Darren Rolland (born 28 September 1998) is a French Muay Thai fighter who has been competing professionally since 2017. He is the current World Boxing Council Muaythai World Featherweight and former WBC Muaythai International Featherweight champion.

He is the winner of the 2016 IFMA World Junior Championship and 2017 European Senior Championship. He is the 2018 FFKMDA Featherweight Muay Thai champion.

Martial arts career
He fought for the first major honor of his professional career in 2019, when he was set to for the WBC Muaythai International Featherweight title. His opponent was the future WBC Muaythai International Super Bantamweight title holder, Ryan Sheehan. Rolland captured the title with a third round TKO.

Rolland was scheduled to fight during Cadiz Fight Night 2, when he was set to face Carlos Coello for the vacant WBC Muaythai World Featherweight title. It was a fight between the current and former WBC Muaythai International champions. Rolland won the fight through a second round knockout.

In late 2019 Rolland signed with ONE Championship. He was soon thereafter scheduled to fight Sam-A Gaiyanghadao during ONE Championship: Century Part 1. While the first round of his fight with the former Lumpini Stadium champion was competitive, Sam-A took over the momentum in the second round. The Thai native scored an early knockdown and, two minutes into the fight, knocked Rolland down with a short left hook. Rolland failed to get up during the ten second countdown, and Sam-A won the fight through a second round KO.

Rolland was scheduled to participate in the Festival La Belle Equipe muay thai tournament, held on 8 December 2021. He was set to face Abdel Cherragi in the tournament semifinals. He beat both Cherragi and Quentin Alhamdou in the finals in the same manner, by decision.

Rolland was booked to face Silviu Vitez in the semifinals of the one-day four-man MFC tournament, held at MFC 025 on December 3, 2022. He beat Vitez by a second-round technical knockout and was able to overcome Iker Valderrama by unanimous decision in the tournament finals. Rolland was next booked to face Fayçal Bahroumi at Duel en Terre des Farangs on January 7, 2023. Bahroumi withdrew from the bout on December 19, and was replaced by Brandon Vieira.

Rolland faced Brandon Vieira for the second time in his career at Duel en Terre des Farangs 2 on January 7, 2023. He won the rematch by unanimous decision.

Rolland faced Daniel McGowan for the WMO International -57.5kg title at the inaugural Hitman Fight League event on April 23, 2023.

Championships accomplishments
Mamba Fight Club
2022 MFC Muaythai -60 kg Tournament Winner
World Boxing Council Muaythai
WBC Muaythai World Featherweight (-57.153 kg) Championship (One time, current)
WBC Muaythai International Featherweight (-57.153 kg) Championship (One time, former)
Fédération Française de Kick Boxing, Muaythaï et Disciplines Associées
FFKMDA Featherweight (-57 kg) Muay Thai Championship
International Federation of Muaythai Associations
 2016 IFMA World Junior Championships -54kg 
 2016 IFMA European Championships B-class -54kg  
 2022 IFMA European Senior Championships -57kg 
 2022 IFMA World Senior Championships -57kg

Fight record

|-  style="background:#;"
| 2023-04-23 || ||align=left| Daniel McGowan || Hitman Fight League || London, England ||  ||  ||  
|-
! style=background:white colspan=9 |
|-  style="background:#cfc;"
| 2023-01-07 || Win ||align=left| Brandon Vieira || Duel en Terre des Farangs 2 || Orléans, France || Decision (Unanimous) || 3 || 3:00 

|-  style="background:#cfc;"
| 2022-12-03 || Win ||align=left| Iker Valderrama || MFC Showdown 25, Final || Ponferrada, Spain || Decision (Unanimous)||  3||3:00
|-
! style=background:white colspan=9 |
|-  style="background:#cfc;"
| 2022-12-03 || Win ||align=left| Silviu Vitez || MFC Showdown 25, Semi Final || Ponferrada, Spain || TKO (Doctor stoppage)|| 2 ||
|-  style="background:#cfc;"
| 2022-11-19 || Win ||align=left| Brandon Vieira ||  Arena Victory || Lille, France || Decision (Unanimous) || 5 || 3:00
|-  style="background:#cfc;"
| 2022-08-27 || Win ||align=left| Omar Halabi ||  Victory Road Championships || Tarablus, Lebanon || Decision || 3 || 3:00
|-  style="background:#cfc;"
| 2022-07-02 || Win ||align=left| Quentin Alhamdou || Le Choc des Best Fighters 6 || Asnières-sur-Seine, France || Decision || 5 || 3:00
|-
! style=background:white colspan=9 |
|-  style="background:#cfc;"
| 2022-06-18 || Win ||align=left| Rachtananchai || La Belle Equipe Festival || Paris, France || Decision || 5 || 3:00
|-
|-  style="background:#cfc;"
| 2022-03-26 || Win ||align=left| Mohamed Ghulam || 1/2 Finales Championnat de France Pro || Aulnay-sous-Bois, France || KO || 1 || 
|-
|-  style="background:#cfc;"
| 2021-12-08 || Win ||align=left| Quentin Alhamdou || Festival La Belle Equipe, Tournament Final || Paris, France || Decision || 5 || 3:00
|-
! style=background:white colspan=9 |
|-  style="background:#cfc;"
| 2021-12-08 || Win ||align=left| Abdel Cherragi || Festival La Belle Equipe, Tournament Semifinal || Paris, France || Decision || 5 || 3:00
|-  style="background:#fbb;"
| 2021-07-10 || Loss ||align=left| Luc Genieys || Le Choc des Etoiles 5, Tournament Semifinal || Châteauneuf-les-Martigues, France || Decision || 3 || 3:00
|-  style="background:#fbb;"
| 2019-10-13|| Loss ||align=left| Sam-A Gaiyanghadao || ONE Championship: Century Part 1 || Tokyo, Japan || KO (Left Hook) || 2 || 1:20
|-  style="background:#cfc;"
| 2019-08-01|| Win ||align=left| Carlos Coello || Cadiz Fight Night 2 || Cadiz, Spain || KO || 2 || 
|-
! style=background:white colspan=9 |
|-  style="background:#fbb;"
| 2019-06-15|| Loss ||align=left| Mathis Djanoyan || Le Choc Des Etoiles 4 || Châteauneuf-les-Martigues, France || Decision (Unanimous) || 3 || 3:00
|-  style="background:#cfc;"
| 2019-04-20|| Win ||align=left| Diogo Silva || Kona Fight || Villiers-sur-Marne, France || Decision (Unanimous) || 3 || 3:00
|-  style="background:#cfc;"
| 2019-03-09|| Win ||align=left| Abdel Cherragi || TEK Fight II || Meaux, France || Decision (Unanimous) || 3 || 3:00
|-  style="background:#cfc;"
| 2019-02-16|| Win ||align=left| Ryan Sheehan || Rumble At The Rockies || Cork, Ireland || TKO (Punches) || 3 || 
|-
! style=background:white colspan=9 |
|-  style="background:#cfc;"
| 2019-01-18|| Win ||align=left| Osvaldo Leal Labrada || Elite Fight VI || Saint-Brieuc, France || Decision (Unanimous) || 3 || 3:00
|-  style="background:#fbb;"
| 2018-07-22|| Loss ||align=left| Luc Genieys || Le Choc Des Gladiateurs || Le Lavandou, France || Decision (Unanimous) || 3 || 3:00
|-  style="background:#cfc;"
| 2018-06-02|| Win ||align=left| Dylan Delpha || Final Fight || Bagnols-sur-Cèze, France || KO || 2 ||
|-  style="background:#fbb;"
| 2018-05-05|| Loss ||align=left| Frederico Cordeiro || Phenix Boxing Only - Edition 6 || Saint-Julien-en-Genevois, France || Decision (Unanimous) || 3 || 3:00
|-  style="background:#cfc;"
| 2018-03-03|| Win ||align=left| Akram Hamidi || TEK Fight || Meaux, France || Decision (Unanimous) || 3 || 3:00
|-  style="background:#cfc;"
| 2017-11-25|| Win ||align=left| Sid Ali Sad || Faubourg Actif 7 || Lille, France || TKO (Retirement) || 2 || 3:00
|-  style="background:#fbb;"
| 2017-10-14|| Loss ||align=left| Akram Hamidi || Shock Muay 9 || Saint-Denis, France || Decision (Unanimous) || 3 || 3:00
|-
| colspan=9 | Legend:    

|-  style="background:#cfc;"
| 2022-06-04|| Win||align=left| Samet Kartal || IFMA Senior World Championships 2022, Final|| Abu Dhabi, United Arab Emirates || Decision (Unanimous)|| 3||3:00
|-
! style=background:white colspan=9 |

|-  style="background:#cfc;"
| 2022-06-02|| Win ||align=left| Yothin Hamuthai || IFMA Senior World Championships 2022, Semi Finals|| Abu Dhabi, United Arab Emirates || Decision (Unanimous)|| 3|| 3:00

|-  style="background:#cfc;"
| 2022-05-31|| Win ||align=left| Mikel Fernandez Cia || IFMA Senior World Championships 2022, Quarter Finals|| Abu Dhabi, United Arab Emirates || Decision (Unanimous) || 3 || 3:00 

|-  bgcolor="#FFBBBB"
| 2022-02-19 || Loss ||align=left| Vladyslav Mykytas || 2022 IFMA European Championship, Semi Final|| Istanbul, Turkey || Decision (29:28) || 3 || 3:00
|-
! style=background:white colspan=9 |

|-  bgcolor="#cfc"
| 2022-02-17 || Win ||align=left| Ismail Al Kadhi || 2022 IFMA European Championship, Quarter Final|| Istanbul, Turkey || Decision (30:27) || 3 || 3:00

|-  bgcolor="#fbb"
| 2017-05-08 || Loss ||align=left| Kokkrachai Chotichanin || 2017 IFMA World Championship, Quarter Final|| Bangkok, Thailand || Decision (30:27)|| 3 ||3:00

|-  bgcolor="#cfc"
| 2016-10-29 || Win||align=left| Bekir Karaomeroglu || 2016 IFMA Junior European Championship, Final|| Split, Croatia || Decision (30:27) || 3 || 3:00
|-
! style=background:white colspan=9 |

|-  bgcolor="#cfc"
| 2016-05-27 || Win||align=left| Martin Mansilla || 2016 IFMA Junior World Championship, Final|| Bangkok, Thailand || Decision (30:27) || 3 || 3:00
|-
! style=background:white colspan=9 |
|-  bgcolor="#cfc"
| 2016-05-25 || Win||align=left| Kernozhyiski || 2016 IFMA Junior World Championship, Semi Final|| Bangkok, Thailand || TKO || 2 ||
|-
|-  bgcolor="#c5d2ea"
| 2015-12-05 || Draw ||align=left| Zakaria Miri || King of Brussels || Brussels, Belgium || Decision || 3 || 2:00
|-
|-  bgcolor="#fbb"
| 2015 || Loss ||align=left| Clément Adrover || 2015 French Junior Muay Thai Championships, Semi Final|| France || Decision || 3 || 3:00
|-
| colspan=9 | Legend:

See also
 List of male kickboxers

References 

Living people
French male kickboxers
French Muay Thai practitioners
1998 births
Featherweight kickboxers
Sportspeople from Paris
ONE Championship kickboxers